Champion (also stylized as Champion U.S.A.) is a brand of clothing, specializing in sportswear owned and marketed by American apparel company Hanesbrands (based in Winston-Salem, North Carolina), which was spun off by the Sara Lee Corporation in 2006. The company was originally based in Rochester, New York, prior to its acquisition by Sara Lee in 1989. Champion is Hanes' second-largest brand.

Products manufactured and commercialised by Champion include casual wear clothing (t-shirts, hoodies, sweatpants, leggings, shorts, jackets, undergarment), footwear (sandals, sneakers, socks), and accessories (bags, hats, collectibles).

History 
The company was established in 1919 by the Feinbloom Brothers as "Knickerbocker Knitting Company." The company soon signed an agreement with the Michigan Wolverines to produce uniforms for their teams. In the 1930s the company was renamed "Champion Knitting Mills Inc.", producing sweatshirts and hoodies. Soon after, Champion products was adopted by the US Military Academy to be used during training exercises and physical education classes.

Champion was acquired by Sara Lee Corporation in 1989. Champion produced uniforms for all the NBA teams during the 1990s and some NFL teams during the 1970s to the 1990s, for both on-field and retail purposes. It has also produced sportswear for many major colleges. Champion was also the kit manufacturer of the Olympic basketball team that competed at the 1992 Summer Olympics.

From 2008, Champion produced kits for Premier League side, Wigan Athletic, the Wales national football team and the jersey of the Greek basketball team, also Pallacanestro Cantù, in Italy.

Champion supplied the football uniforms for the Notre Dame Fighting Irish. In 2001 Notre Dame signed a five-year exclusive agreement with Adidas, which ended a partnership Champion had with the university that spanned over 50 years.

Sponsorships

Basketball 
  KK Dynamic
   National Basketball League

Past sponsorships 
In the past, Champion manufactured uniforms mostly for basketball and American football teams, most notable its long-time partnership with the National Basketball Association (NBA) that extended until 2004, when Reebok took over. Champion also sponsored International association FIBA until 2017.

The following is a list of some of them:

American/Canadian football 

  XFL (2001)
  CFL (1987–89)
  Chicago Bears (1993–95)
  Cincinnati Bengals (1989–96, 1998)
  Buffalo Bills (1988–96)
  Indianapolis Colts (1987–92)
  Atlanta Falcons (1990–91)
  New York Jets (1990–96)
  New Orleans Saints (1990–96)

Association football 
  Wigan Athletic (2008–09)
  Sochaux (2003–05, including the last season as main sponsor of the club)
  Parma (1999–2005, including the last season as main sponsor of the club)
  Cosmos (1975–76) 
  Wales national team (2008–10)

Basketball 

   NBA – all teams (1990–1997), some teams (1997–2002)
  U.S. national team (1992–2000)
  Cyprus national team (2015)
  Italy national team (1996–2016)
  Zadar
  Virtus Bologna (1999–2005)
  FMP
  Dynamic VIP PAY

Lacrosse
  USA national team

Merchandising licenses 
Replica jersey uniforms made by Champion in the licensed sports business:
   NBA – all teams (1990–2002)
  NFL – all teams (1980s–2000)
  XFL – all teams (2001)

References

External links

 

1990s fashion
2020s fashion
Clothing companies established in 1919
Clothing companies of the United States
Companies based in Winston-Salem, North Carolina
Hanesbrands
Sara Lee Corporation brands
Sporting goods manufacturers of the United States
Sportswear brands